Rose "Rosie" Folder (later Powell; May 12, 1926 – July 3, 2014) was an outfield/infield utility and pitcher who played in the All-American Girls Professional Baseball League in the 1944 season.

Folder was a very dependable player during her only year in the league. ״Rosie״, as she was nicknamed, was able to play at shortstop, third base, right field, and also volunteered to pitch when her team suffered a shortage of hurlers. In addition, she displayed some power and consistently hit line drives.

Born in Springfield, Illinois, Folder attended the now extinct Feitshans High School, where a Lutheran pastor taught her everything she had to know about baseball. He was really interested in putting a team together, and showed her how to pitch. Then she played for a fastpitch softball team.

In 1943, Folder took a part-time job in a spark plugs factory in Chicago during the day, and played semi-professional softball for the Tungsten Sparks team at night. An AAGPBL scout spotted Folder while playing for the Sparks and invited her for a tryout. At the end of her senior year in high school, she took her exams early to attend the 1944 spring training camp at Peru, Illinois.

Folder was allocated to the Kenosha Comets, a team managed by former big leaguer Marty McManus. We learned to play baseball from former major leaguers and were turned from tomboys to ladies by the charm school classes, she explained in interview.

In 1944, she posted a pitching record of 2–7 with a 5.67 earned run average in 14 games, but she was even better as a hitter. Her .261 batting average was the seventh-best in the league, a pretty good performance considering it was a dominant pitching league and no batters surpassed .300 on the year.

Kenosha won the first half of the season and faced the second-half winning Milwaukee Chicks in the 1944 Scholarship Series. The series went to the limit of seven games and Milwaukee clinched the championship, four to three. During the postseason, Folder tried to make a shoestring catch at left field and sprained an ankle, which limited her playing time to one game. She went hitless in one at-bat.

Folder returned home, married Edward Powell in 1946, and raised four girls and two boys. The couple had ten grandchildren and nine great-grandchildren. Besides this, she attended Illinois State Normal University in Normal, and also ran a daycare business in Carnation, Washington for 25 years.

She is part of Women in Baseball, a permanent display based at the Baseball Hall of Fame and Museum in Cooperstown, New York, which was unveiled in 1988 to honor the entire All-American Girls Professional Baseball League. Though she did not attend the ceremony, she traveled to Cooperstown to see her name in the hall. "That was the biggest thrill of my life", she said of the event.

Rose Folder Powell died on July 3, 2014 in Carnation, Washington, aged 88.

Career statistics
Batting

Pitching

Sources

All-American Girls Professional Baseball League players
Kenosha Comets players
Baseball players from Illinois
Sportspeople from Springfield, Illinois
1926 births
2014 deaths
People from Carnation, Washington
21st-century American women